The Men's 400 metre freestyle event at the 2015 African Games took place on 9 September 2015 at Kintele Aquatic Complex.

Schedule
All times are Congo Standard Time (UTC+01:00)

Records
Prior to the competition, the existing world and championship records were as follows.

The following new records were set during this competition.

Results

Heats 
The heats were held on 9 September.

Final 

The final were held on 9 September.

References

External links
Official website 

Swimming at the 2015 African Games